Gungame or variant, may refer to:

 Gun game, a genre of videogames, which use physical gun accessories
 List of gun games
 Shooter game, a genre of videogames, which involve players shooting guns in-game
 Shooting sports, such as target shooting, some of which have game variants.
 Airsoft games, such as paintball, tagball
 Laser tag games

See also
 Gun (video game), a video game named "Gun"
 Space Gun (video game), a video game named "Space Gun"
 Gun fu, a fictional martial art that uses guns as its focal weapon, used in fictional games of guns
 Game gun (disambiguation)
 Gun (disambiguation)
 Game (disambiguation)